Wilhelm Klopfer (1 June 1901 – ?) was a Swiss rower. He competed at the 1936 Summer Olympics in Berlin with the men's coxless pair where they came fifth.

References

1901 births
Year of death missing
Swiss male rowers
Olympic rowers of Switzerland
Rowers at the 1936 Summer Olympics
European Rowing Championships medalists
20th-century Swiss people